Phytoecia atripennis is a species of beetle in the family Cerambycidae. It was described by Stephan von Breuning in 1951. It is known from the Democratic Republic of the Congo.

References

Phytoecia
Beetles described in 1951
Endemic fauna of the Democratic Republic of the Congo